Under Nineteen  was a survival show on Munhwa Broadcasting Corporation for trainees under the age of 19 years old. There were  a total of 57 contestants competing to debut as a member of 1THE9. The trainees were put into groups that specializes in vocals, rapping, and performance. The show aired between November 3, 2018 and February 9, 2019.

Concept 
Under Nineteen introduces singers, rappers, dancers and also trainees with the ability to produce music and choreograph. 57 aspiring boy band members will come to compete for a spot to be in a new K-pop idol group. Once down to the final 19 trainees only 9 of them will have the chance of being the next idol group. The winning group will sign a contract for 12 months and be managed by MBK Entertainment.

Directors 
 Kim So-hyun - Host & Official Supporter of the group
 Dynamic Duo - Rap Director, Gaeko & Choiza
 Crush - Vocal Director
 Solji - Vocal Director, member of EXID
 Eunhyuk - Performance Director, member of Super Junior
 Hwang Sang-hoon - Performance Director, SM Entertainment Performance Director & Choreographer for Super Junior, SHINee, EXO & NCT.

Special director and guests 
 Sunday
 Yesung
 Yunho
 Don Spike
 Jaehyo, P.O, U-Kwon
 Ravi, Ken
 Hani, LE
 Leeteuk
 Shindong
 Yerin
 J-Hope
 Kai

Episodes

Episode 1 (November 3, 2018) 
57 trainees, who aspire to become the next K-pop idol, divide up into three groups of 19. Vocal Team, Rap Team, and Performance Team all show off what they can do in their first Ranking Evaluation. The directors watch and evaluate their performances and give them a score. According to their scores, they are ranked in their team. These rankings will prove to be important for the first mission.

Episode 2 (November 10, 2018) 
The trainees from Rap team, Vocals team, and Performance team present their own unique stages to be ranked in their team. The trainees compete against each other and the ranking keeps changing. After that, the trainees move to the training camp to go through special training sessions.

Episode 3 (November 17, 2018) 
Each team is given a theme song for this next mission. Their parts are divided amongst the members according to their rankings. Much to their displeasure, the parts are mostly given to the high-ranking members. However, they are told that there will be a Judgment Day where the members can take one another's parts. Some will gain parts while others will lose them. The Vocal team performed their song "Go Tomorrow" and was ranked by the studio audience and online viewers. Upon the airing of this episode, all three songs each team performed had a music video released.

Episode 4 (November 24, 2018) 
After the Vocal team's performance, the remaining two teams are nervous. In the midst of the overwhelming atmosphere, the Performance team takes the stage. We get a sneak peek at what their practices were like. Despite the best dancers being in one team, they go through a lot of struggles and get reprimanded on their attitude. It's Judgment Day, and many of the low-ranking members challenge the members with parts for an opportunity to stand in the spotlight.

Episode 5 (December 1, 2018) 
With just two days left before the final performance, Team Rap is in a lot of trouble. In the eyes of their directors, they are unprepared for their performance, and the tension causes a rift between the members. After the final performance, the trainees gather to hear the results of the on-site voting as well as their second mission, position evaluation. They are given 30 K-Pop songs and each team gets to perform 2 songs of their directors choice.

Episode 6 (December 8, 2018) 
In the midst of preparing for their second ranking evaluation, the 57 trainees are faced with the reality that they must say goodbye to 8 members. With Team Performance in first place, they can focus solely on their second performance, but Team Rap and Team Vocals cannot ignore the fact that they could be eliminated.

Episode 7 (December 15, 2018) 
As there are two teams for each position, the Position Competition is divided into Round 1 and Round 2. After the devastating loss of almost half their members, Team Rap's Team “H.E.R” faces a crisis in their performance. During the rehearsals, everyone is intimidated by Team Vocals’ Team “I Need U”. In a twist of fate, Team Performance and Team Rap go back to back in their performance of “H.E.R”.

Episode 8 (December 22, 2018) 
The three teams prepare for Round 2. With Team Rap in the lead, the other two teams are prepared to do their best to beat them. However, during their Interim Evaluations, the directors of Team Rap and Team Vocals are disappointed with the quality and decide that changes must be made to win.

Episode 9 (December 29, 2018) 
The trainees take a break from their preparations to show off their various charms for Christmas. Super Junior's Shindong and Leeteuk as well as GFRIEND’s Yerin make a guest appearance as MCs for a special corner called "Weekly Trainees". The trainees compete with each other to win prizes to enjoy while being in the training center. Also, the Second Ranking Announcement is held, and the trainees must say goodbye to nine people.

Episode 10 (January 5, 2019) 
This time the three teams are combined into 6 units to compete with one another for a benefit of 10,000 votes. The combinations of each unit was chosen by fans on the online voting system for the following songs: "Fake Love" by BTS, "Growl" by Exo, "Sherlock" by SHINee, "Fiction" by BEAST, "Mirotic" by TVXQ and "Be Mine" by INFINITE. They must prepare a performance with an internationally ranked song. Yesterday's friend becomes today's enemy as the mission gets heated up. Taek Hyeon shows off his MC skills when the units choose their competitor. Special director J-Hope stops by to help the "Fake Love" team with the choreography and gives his expertise.

Episode 11 (January 12, 2019) 
The results for the first round of the Shuffle Mission are revealed. Unit “Fiction” goes up against Unit “Be Mine”, and Unit “Sherlock” goes up against Unit “Growl”. During practice, there is trouble between the members of Unit “Fiction”, and it is apparent even on stage during the rehearsals. Unit “Sherlock” is upset for being treated as the weakest link and practices really hard to beat Unit “Growl”. Meanwhile, Kai from EXO gives tips to Unit “Growl”.

Episode 12 (January 19, 2019) 
It's the last mission before the live broadcast. Among the remaining trainees, only 25 will make it to the Collaboration Mission. During the Third Ranking Announcement, So Hyun has a surprising announcement regarding the dismissal of one of the trainees for misconduct. The Collaboration Mission begins, and each team and their directors put on the performance of a lifetime. Knowing it might be their last shot, everyone works hard to leave no regrets.

Episode 13 (January 26, 2019) 
It's the day of the Fourth Ranking Announcement, and the top 19 trainees have been determined. During the announcement So Hyun broke the news about Ji Jin-seok and Bang Jun-hyuk's departure due to health reasons. After the announcements, the trainees gather for a special segment called "The Trainee." With special MCs, Shindong and Ye Rin, we get a look at the trainees’ first audition, their work fashion, and a prank that shows their character. The trainees laugh and enjoy themselves one last time before the final live broadcast.

Episode 14 (February 9, 2019) 
After months of blood, sweat, and tears put into this competition, UNDER NINETEEN is finally coming to an end. Today is the long-awaited live broadcast to find out who will make it into the final 9 and debut. The trainees divide up into two groups to perform new songs. There is tension in the air as it's their last chance to gain the support of their fans and debut. Who will make it into the top nine and debut as 1the9?

Contestants 

Color key (In order of contestant's rank on the show)

Rankings 
The top 9 contestants were determined by online and onsite voting, the results of which were announced at the end of each episode. The top 9 contestants at the final vote determined the final group.

Color key

Result 

During the last episode aired on February 9, 2019, Kim So-hyun and Leeteuk announced the unit boy band's name: 1THE9 (Hangul: 원더나인).

Missions

Theme Song Mission (Episode 3–5)

Position Mission (Episode 6–8) 

Color key

Shuffle Mission (Episode 10–11) 
Color key

 Leader

Collaboration Mission (Episode 12)

Discography

Singles

Ratings
In the table below, the blue numbers represent the lowest ratings and the red numbers represent the highest ratings.

Awards and nominations

Aftermath
 1the9 released their debut extended play (EP) XIX on April 13, 2019.  After one and a half years of activities, 1the9 disbanded on August 8, 2020 following their contract expiration.
 Jeon Do-yum signed an exclusive contract with Bluedot Entertainment and debuted as the members of Just B under the stage names DY and Bain on June 30, 2021.
 Kim Tae-woo signed an exclusive contract with Keystone Entertainment and debuted as a member of BLANK2Y under the stage name Louis.
 Shin Ye-chan signed an exclusive contract with Spire Entertainment and  debuted as a member of Omega X on June 30, 2021.
 Jeong Taek-hyeon is currently active as an actor.
 Yoo Yong-ha and Kim Jun-seo debuted as the members of Oui Entertainment's boy group WEi.
 Park Sung-won signed an exclusive contract with RAIN Company and debuted as a member of Ciipher.
 Lee Seung-hwan left Play M Entertainment and participated on SBS's reality survival show Loud. However, he was eliminated in the first round of the show. In 2021 Lee joined RBW but has since left. Currently he is a contestant on the Mnet survival show Boys Planet.
 Jung Jin-sung left Play M Entertainment.

 
 Some trainees debuted with groups:
 Song Jae-won signed an exclusive contract with Yuehua Entertainment and debuted as a member of their new boy group Tempest under the stage name Hwarang.
 Park Si-young and Khael debuted as the members of DSP Media's new boy group Mirae on March 17, 2020.
 Bang Jun-hyuk debuted as a member of TOP Media's new boy group MCND under the stage name Win on February 27, 2020.
 Song Byeong-hee debuted, alongside ITHE9 member Jeon Do-yeom, in the group Just B on June 30, 2021 and adopted the stage name Bain.
Lee Ye-chan will debut on KQ's newest boy group Xikers on March 30, 2023.
 Some contestants partecipated/are partecipating in other survival shows
Wumuti is currently partecipating on Mnet's survival show Boys Planet.

References 

Under Nineteen
2018 South Korean television series debuts
Korean-language television shows
South Korean reality television series
2018 South Korean television seasons
2019 South Korean television series endings
MBC TV original programming